The 2006 Man Booker Prize was awarded at a ceremony on 10 October 2006. The Prize was awarded to Kiran Desai for The Inheritance of Loss.

Judges

Hermione Lee (chair)
Simon Armitage
Candia McWilliam
Anthony Quinn
Fiona Shaw

Shortlist

Longlist

Sources
 2006 Man Booker Prize

Man Booker
Booker Prizes by year
2006 awards in the United Kingdom